The Israel Prison Service (Sherut Batei HaSohar, Idārat al-Sujūn al-Isrā’īlīyyah), known in Israel by its acronym Shabas or IPS in English, is the state agency responsible for overseeing prisons in Israel. It is under the jurisdiction of the Ministry of Public Security. In 2014, its workforce was 8,800.

History

The IPS is divided into three blocs: North (north of Netanya), Center (between Netanya and Ashdod), and South (south of Ashkelon and Jerusalem). The IPS is headed by the Commissioner of Prisons. In 2014, there were 33 correctional facilities, including five detention centers, housing a total of 25,000 prisoners. 60% were serving time for criminal offenses and 40% for security offences. In December 2011, there were 307 administrative detainees held without trial. Of these detainees seventeen had been detained for between two and four and a half years. One had been detained for more than five years. None were minors. Israel Prison Service personnel are trained in krav maga ("contact combat") and conduct training for the prison service (kli'a) wing of the Israeli Military Police.

Living conditions and prisoners' rights
Conditions in Israeli prisons generally meet international standards. IPS facilities, interrogation facilities and IDF provisional detention centers are regularly monitored by the International Committee of the Red Cross, and occasionally, by the Israel Bar Association and Public Defender's Office.

Prison conditions are equal for male and female prisoners, and all prisoners are free to practice their religion. All Israeli citizens have the right to vote whilst in prison.

Inmates are entitled to visits from their lawyers and family members, and security prisoners are allowed Red Cross visits. Inmates who are married or in common-law relationships have the right to conjugal visits.

In 2011, ICRC maintained a program that enabled Palestinians from the West Bank to visit relatives held in Israeli prisons. A similar scheme for the Gaza Strip was halted by the Israeli government following the Hamas takeover of the Gaza Strip in 2007.

Prison inmates have the right to file grievances about their conditions to the courts, the Israel Prison Service management and the Israel Police Unit for the investigation of Prison Service personnel. Credible allegations of inhumane conditions are duly investigated by the authorities, which documents the results publicly.

Inmates who were not convicted of terrorism offenses also have the right to free university education, under a special education program in which they take online academic programs from the Open University of Israel, and their tuition is financed by prison authorities. This right was rescinded for those imprisoned for terrorism offenses in 2011.

In a report of the Public Defense Office based on unannounced inspections, the living conditions at the facilities, as of 2017–18, were found to be often unfit for human habitation, along with widespread cases of inmates' rights violation.

On 25 March 2020, a Palestinian  prisoner in the Nafha prison of Israel reportedly set fire to a guard room protesting against the neglect shown towards the health conditions of the prisoners by the prison administrations, amid the coronavirus outbreak. The inmate, Ayman Sharabati, who is serving a life sentence at the prison, set fire to the guard room when he along with other prisoners was sent out for walk, according to Qadri Abu Bakr, head of the Palestinian Authority's Prisoners Affairs Commission. Reportedly, the IPS lacks the appropriate medical aid and provision necessary to prevent the outbreak of COVID-19 among the prisoners.

Privately run prisons
The Knesset passed a law allowing private prisons in 2004, and plans for privately run prisons were introduced in 2006. The state hoped to save money by transferring prisoners to such facilities, which would eliminate the need to invest in more infrastructure and manpower. In 2009, the Israeli Supreme Court struck down the plans, ruling that private prisons are an unconstitutional violation of basic human rights. Following the decision, the state had to pay compensation to a company that had already completed construction of the first private prison, near Beersheba.

List of prisons and detention centers

Northern District

Carmel Prison (Oren Junction)
Damon Prison (Rimon Junction)
Gilboa Prison (HaShita Junction)
Hermon Prison (North Tzalmon Creek Junction)
Megiddo Prison (Megiddo Junction)
Shata Prison (HaShita Junction)
Tzalmon Prison (North Tzalmon Creek Junction)

Central District

Ashmoret Prison (HaSharon Junction)
Ayalon Prison (Ramla)
Giv'on Prison (Ramla)
HaSharon Prison (Hadarim Interchange)
Maasiyahu Prison (Ramla)
Nitzan-Magen Prison (Ramla)
Neve Tirtza Women's Prison (Ramla)
Ofek Juvenile Prison (Even Yehuda)
Ofer Prison (West Bank, between Ramallah/Beituniya and Giv'at Ze'ev)
Rimonim Prison (Even Yehuda)

Southern District

Beersheba Prison (prison complex) in Beersheba
Dekel Prison
Eshel Prison
Ela Prison
Ktzi'ot Prison (Ktzi'ot Junction)
Nafha Prison (Mitzpe Ramon)
Ramon Prison (Mitzpe Ramon, right next to Nafha Prison)
Saharonim Prison (Ktzi'ot Junction)
Shikma Prison (Ashkelon)

Detention centers

Eilat Detention Center (Southern District)
Hadarim Detention Center (Central District)
Jerusalem Detention Center (see also Russian Compound) 
Kishon Detention Center (Northern District) 
Nitzan Detention Center (Central District)
Ohalei Kedar Detention Center (Southern District)
Petah Tikva Detention Center (Central District)
Tel Aviv Detention Center, aka Abu Kabir Detention Center (Central District)

Ranks
The current ranks (circa 2007). Their military equivalent is shown in parentheses.

Jailers
They wear their rank insignia on their upper sleeves.
Soher – Warder
Rav Soher – Chief Warder (Corporal)
Samal – Sergeant
Rav Samal – Chief Sergeant (Staff Sergeant)

Non-Commissioned Officers
They wear their rank insignia on their collars.
Rav Samal Rishon – Chief Sergeant First Class (First Sergeant)
Rav Samal Mitkadem – Master Chief Sergeant (Sergeant Major)
Rav Samal Bakhir – Command Chief Sergeant (Command Sergeant Major)
Rav Nagad  – Chief NCO (Warrant Officer)

Officers
They wear their rank insignia on their epaulets or shoulderboards.
 Meyshar Mishne – Junior Inspector (2nd Lieutenant)
 Meyshar – Inspector (1st Lieutenant)
 Kalai – Superintendent (Captain)
 Rav Kalai – Chief Superintendent (Major)
 Sgan Gundar – Deputy Commissioner (Lieutenant Colonel)
  Gundar Mishne – Junior Commissioner (Colonel)
 Tat Gundar – Assistant Commissioner (Brigadier General)
 Gundar – Commissioner (Major General)
 Rav Gundar – Chief Commissioner (Lieutenant General) – Commander of the prison service.

Special units

Metzada unit 
Metzada unit (named after Masada) is IPS's hostage rescue and special operations unit, one of five hostage rescue units in Israel.

Nachson unit 

Nahshon is the IPS's main intervention and conveyance unit and deals with searches, silencing disturbances, guarding IPS staff, etc.
The Nachson unit is the operational arm of the Israel Prison Service (IPS). The unit was established in 1973, and serves as the central unit for the observation of prisoners, operational interventions and security. The tasks of the unit include, among others: escorting prisoners and detainees from an incarceration facility to another location, and intervening during irregular events that may take place to establish order and security. The unit helps conduct broad searches within prisons to find weapons, drugs, information, notes, explosives, mobile phones, SIM cards, and any information about possible enemy terrorist attacks. The unit must also ensure the safety of prison staff members who have been threatened (them and their families) by delivering prisoners to foreign countries as part of international extradition agreements for prisoners, escorting detainees to court and he is responsible for maintaining the security of the courtroom, and even escorts dangerous prisoners on their home visits and when they leave prison for medical treatment. Members of the Nachshon unit escort around 1,800 prisoners, criminals and terrorists daily in the unit's vehicles, resulting in an annual number of 390,000 prisoners. The unit has hundreds of specially designed operational vehicles, from buses to trucks to motorcycles, all of which are adapted to escort the prisoners. Vehicles serve as mobile prisons, transporting a violent and dangerous sector of society that is very likely to try to escape. These vehicles can operate both day and night and can reach anywhere in the country. The Nachshon unit is divided into 3 brigades scattered throughout the country (north, center and south), and under the command of the unit's headquarters.

Yamar Dror 
Yamar Dror, founded at the end of 1993, is the IPS unit for fighting narcotics. It specializes in searches and interrogation.

Commanders

Giri Gera (1949–1951)
Ram Salomon (1951–1952)
Zvi Hermon (1952–1958)
Aryeh Nir (1958–1976)
Haim Levi (1976–1981)
Mordechai Wertheimer (1981–1985)
Rafael Suissa (1985–1986)
David Maimon (1986–1987)
Levy Shaul (1987–1990)
Gabi Amir (1990–1993)
Aryeh Bibi (1993–1997)
Amos Azani (1997–2000)
Orit Adato (2000–2003)
Ya'akov Ganot (2003–2007)
Benny Kaniak (2007–2011)
Aharon Franco (2011–2015)
Ofra Klinger (2015–2018)
Asher Vaknin (Acting; 2018–2021)
Katy Perry (2021–present)

See also

Hashmira
Mount Carmel Forest Fire (2010)
Palestinian prisoners of Israel

References

Further reading
Israel Behind Bars: True Stories of Hope And Redemption, by Major (retired) Rabbi Fishel Jacobs.

External links

Official website- Prisoner Care

Shabas
Prison and correctional agencies
Penal system in Israel